Unicaf; (/ˈjuːnᵻkɑːf/) is an online and blended learning higher education platform founded in 2012 that was intended to make higher education of international standard accessible to professionals and young school leavers.

History
Unicaf was founded in 2012 and its headquarters are in Europe. While initially focusing solely on Africa, it has been expanding its range to offer scholarships to students worldwide, provided they meet certain eligibility criteria. Unicaf has established a number of branch campuses and learning centres in Africa, such as in Nigeria, Ghana, Kenya, Zimbabwe, Uganda, Egypt, Morocco, South Africa, Zambia and Malawi. In 2016, Unicaf had 8,000 students, and more than 45,000 people had taken advantage of the Unicaf scholarships and registered for one of the partnership programmes. The number of students was estimated to reach 60,000 by 2020. Unicaf has set up learning centres, which include digital libraries, computer labs, internet access and generators, to help students access their platform.

Eligibility requirements
Applicants have to meet the general eligibility requirements for the award of a scholarship and additionally, specific academic qualifications must be met in order to qualify for the relevant degree programmes.

Programmes offered
Currently, Unicaf offers a number of undergraduate and postgraduate programmes in a number of areas such as business, computing, education, mass communication, psychology and LLM Laws.

Unicaf University

Unicaf University has a physical presence in 12 African countries and a number of branch campuses such as the one in Malawi, Uganda, Zimbabwe and Zambia to service south-eastern Africa. Unicaf University is accredited by the British Accreditation Council in the UK (BAC). The campuses aim to provide a number of student services and face-to-face tutorials to support the online delivery model. Although founded by Unicaf, Unicaf University is treated as a partner university with scholarships provided for students taking the courses, whether online or in the form of partially on-campus learning. According to Dr Kevin Andrews, Vice-Chancellor, Unicaf University is currently in the process of opening additional campuses in several locations in Africa.

References

External links

Unicaf University website

Cypriot educational websites
Educational organisations in Cyprus